The men's 4 x 400 metres relay at the 1954 European Athletics Championships was held in Bern, Switzerland, at Stadion Neufeld on 28 and 29 August 1954.

Medalists

Results

Final
29 August

Heats
28 August

Heat 1

Heat 2

Heat 3

Participation
According to an unofficial count, 44 athletes from 11 countries participated in the event.

 (4)
 (4)
 (4)
 (4)
 (4)
 (4)
 (4)
 (4)
 (4)
 (4)
 (4)

References

4 x 400 metres relay
4 x 400 metres relay at the European Athletics Championships